This is a list of notable dormitory buildings.

Historic buildings in the US
The following ones have been individually listed on the U.S. National Register of Historic Places and hence are individually notable.

Ranger's Dormitory, Grand Canyon, Arizona
Miss Orton's Classical School for Girls (Dormitory), Pasadena, California
Cabin Creek Ranger Residence and Dormitory, Wilsonia, California, a rustic dormitory in a remote location
Yulee-Mallory-Reid Dormitory Complex, Gainesville, Florida
State Teachers and Agricultural College for Negroes Women's Dormitory and Teachers' Cottage, Forsyth, Georgia
Dorchester Academy Boys' Dormitory, Midway, Georgia
Lemhi Boarding School Girls Dormitory, Lemhi, Idaho
Idaho State Industrial School Women's Dormitory, St. Anthony, Idaho
St. John's Lutheran College Girls Dormitory, Winfield, Kansas
West Dormitory-St. John's College, Winfield, Kansas
Marvin College Boys Dormitory, Clinton, Kentucky
Tangipahoa Parish Training School Dormitory, Kentwood, Louisiana
Indian Dormitory, Mackinac Island, Michigan
Morris Industrial School for Indians Dormitory, Morris, Minnesota
Administration Building-Girls' Dormitory, Minnesota School for the Deaf, Faribault, Minnesota
Fergus County Improvement Corporation Dormitory, Lewistown, Montana
Employees' New Dormitory and Club, Albuquerque, New Mexico
Allison Dormitory, Santa Fe, New Mexico
North Carolina School for the Blind and Deaf Dormitory, Raleigh, North Carolina
Zaneis School Teacher's Dormitory, Healdton, Oklahoma
Lutheran Theological Seminary Building: Beam Dormitory, Columbia, South Carolina
Settlement School Dormitories and Dwellings Historic District, Gatlinburg, Tennessee
Scottish Rite Dormitory, Austin, Texas
St. Edward's University Main Building and Holy Cross Dormitory, Austin, Texas
Utah School for the Deaf and Blind Boys' Dormitory, Ogden, Utah
White River Mess Hall and Dormitory, White River Entrance, Washington

Other dormitory buildings are listed on the NRHP as contributing buildings in historic districts.

Other
There are other notable dormitory buildings:
Mather House (Harvard University), where Facebook started

See also
List of YMCA buildings
List of YWCA buildings

References

University and college residential buildings